Major Arthur James Terence Fleming-Sandes  (24 June 1894 – 24 May 1961) was an English recipient of the Victoria Cross, the highest and most prestigious award for gallantry in the face of the enemy that can be awarded to British and Commonwealth forces.

Early life
Fleming-Sandes was born at Northstead Road, Tulse Hill Park, London on 24 June 1894 the son of Alfred Fleming-Sandes. He was educated at Dulwich College Preparatory School and at King's School, Canterbury. The day after the start of the First World War he enlisted as a private in the Artists Rifles and was on active duty in France from October 1914. On 9 May 1915 he was commissioned as a temporary second lieutenant in The East Surrey Regiment.

Victoria Cross
Fleming-Sandes was 21 years old, and a temporary second lieutenant in the 2nd Battalion, The East Surrey Regiment, British Army during the First World War when the following deed took place for which he was awarded the VC.

On 29 September 1915 at the Hohenzollern Redoubt, France, Second Lieutenant Fleming-Sandes was sent to command a company which was in a very critical position. Although severely wounded almost at once, he continued to advance and throw bombs until he was again wounded. This act put new heart into his men and saved the situation.

His Victoria Cross is displayed at the Queen's Royal Surrey Regiment Museum, Clandon Park, Surrey.

Later life
Fleming-Sandes left the Army as a lieutenant at the end of the war and in 1919 he joined the educational department of the Sudan government. In 1924 he moved to the political department and in 1931 he was awarded the Order of the Nile. In 1935 he was appointed a Judge of the Sudan High Court and he married Dorothea May Weeks the following year. From 1942 he was Judge Advocate-General of the Sudan Defence Force before he retired in 1944 and returned to England. Upon his return to England he became chairman of the Pensions Appeal Tribunal for England and Wales until 1948. He died on 24 May 1961 aged 66.

References

 Regimental biography
Monuments to Courage (David Harvey, 1999)
The Register of the Victoria Cross (This England, 1997)
VCs of the First World War - The Western Front 1915 (Peter F. Batchelor & Christopher Matson, 1999)

External links

Location of grave and VC medal (Devonshire)
 

British World War I recipients of the Victoria Cross
British Army personnel of World War I
East Surrey Regiment officers
Artists' Rifles soldiers
People educated at The King's School, Canterbury
People from Tulse Hill
1894 births
1961 deaths
Members of Gray's Inn
Sudan Political Service officers
British Army recipients of the Victoria Cross
Anglo-Egyptian Sudan judges
Military personnel from London